Ruth Bluford Anderson (October 28, 1921 Braden, Oklahoma-January 22, 2013 Waterloo, Iowa) was a social worker and professor at the University of Northern Iowa (UNI).

Biography
Roy and Josie Bluford, Oklahoma sharecroppers, had five children and Ruth was the oldest. The family moved from Oklahoma to Sioux City, Iowa when she was seven. Her father went to work at the Cudahy Packing Company.  Her parents divorced in 1933. Her mother was unable to provide for the family on her earnings as a part time maid at a hotel and she went on pun
Ic assistance. 

She married Everett McKinnis in Reno, Nevada on February 19, 1946. They had two sons Dwayne and Keith.  The couple divorced in 1959. She married Danny Oliver on September 23, 1961 and divorced in 1964. On June 8, 1968, she married James C. Anderson and became stepmother to five children. Her autobiography, From Mother’s Aid Child to University Professor: the autobiography of am American Black Woman was published in 1985.

Education
Anderson received her undergraduate education from University of California, Berkeley, Class of 1946.  She was working for the Westchester County, New York Welfare Department when she earned a Master of Social Work in 1956 from the Columbia University School of Social Work.

Career
While married to McKinnis, she moved to Waterloo, Iowa and began working for the Black Hawk County, Iowa Department of Public Welfare until she began teaching at Wartburg College in 1967.  Two years later, she began teaching social work at UNI.  After not receiving tenure nor becoming a full professor, Anderson took legal action against UNI.  She won the case in am out of court settlement which has been considered a victory for all female at Iowa public universities.

Anderson was elected to the Black Hawk County Board of Supervisors in 1988. Sue was the first African American woman in Iowa to do so.

Honors and awards
Anderson was inducted into the Iowa Women's Hall of Fame in 1982.  Simpson College awarded her a Doctor of Humane Letters in 1990. The National Association of Social Workers awarded her a lifetime achievement award in 2012. In 1996, she was inducted into the Iowa African American Hall of Fame.

References

1921 births
2013 deaths
Iowa Women's Hall of Fame Inductees
University of California, Berkeley alumni
Columbia University School of Social Work alumni
Wartburg College faculty
University of Northern Iowa faculty
American social workers